Judd Lalich (born 26 December 1975) is a former Australian rules footballer with the Essendon Football Club.

He was recruited from East Perth.

References

External links
 Official Profile

1975 births
Living people
Essendon Football Club players
East Perth Football Club players
Australian rules footballers from Western Australia